Joan Oxland (1920–2009) was a Welsh artist and teacher.

Biography
Oxland was born in Cardiff and was educated at Cardiff High School for Girls. She studied at the Cardiff School of Art and Wimbledon School of Art before training at the Institute of Education, which was then part of the University of London. After some years teaching in both York and Cardiff, Oxland spent 1962 and 1963 studying at the Academie Julian in Paris. She then returned to teaching as a department head at the Cardiff High School for Girls, before becoming head of the design department at Llandaff College of Education. She held that post until 1972, when she taught at Llanederyrn High School in Cardiff. From 1973, she worked as an artist and tutor for the Workers Educational Association.

During her time as a teacher, Oxland continued to paint and exhibit works, often landscapes of the French regions. She regularly showed works at the Royal Academy in London during the 1950s, and was a member of and occasional office holder with, both the South Wales Group and the South Wales Artists Society. Her work regularly featured in the annual Pictures for Welsh Schools exhibition held at the National Museum Cardiff between 1951 and 1960 and she also exhibited, on at least two occasions at the Welsh National Eisteddfod. During her career, Oxland held a dozen solo exhibitions including at Newport Cathedral in 1964 and at the Chapter Arts Centre in Cardiff during 1974. The Welsh Arts Council, the National Museum of Wales and both Newport and Neath galleries hold examples of her work.

References

External links

1920 births
2009 deaths
20th-century Welsh painters
20th-century Welsh women artists
21st-century Welsh painters
21st-century Welsh women artists
Alumni of Cardiff School of Art and Design
Académie Julian alumni
Alumni of the UCL Institute of Education
Alumni of Wimbledon College of Arts
Artists from Cardiff
People educated at Cardiff High School
Welsh women painters